Tetramethylammonium perchlorate is a perchlorate salt with a condensed formula [N(CH3)4]+ClO4−.

Preparation 
Tetramethylammonium perchlorate can be produced by mixing cold, dilute perchloric acid with cold tetramethylammonium hydroxide, the reaction will lead to a white precipitation.

Uses 
The perchlorate is used as an intermediate in organic synthesis, in chromatography and as a supporting electrolyte in electrochemistry. Along with trimethylammonium perchlorate, it was investigated as a component in composite propellants during the Cold War, but without much success.

References

Further reading 

 Hofmann, K. A.; Roth, R.; Hobold, K.; Metzler, A. Relationship between the Constitution and Behavior towards Water of Ammonium Oxonium Perchlorates. Berichte der Deutschen Chemischen Gesellschaft, 1911. 43: 2624-2630. 

Perchlorates
Tetramethylammonium salts